Inger Berggren (23 February 1934 – 19 July 2019) was a Swedish singer. Her biggest hits were "Sol och vår" and "Elisabeth serenad", both in 1962.

Berggren was born in Stockholm.  She began her vocal career with Thore Swanerud's orchestra, and later sang with Thore Ehrling, Simon Brehm, and Göte Wilhelmsson. Berggren represented Sweden in the Eurovision Song Contest 1962 in Luxembourg with the song "Sol och vår" which was placed seventh. She was the mother of the actress Gunilla Röör.

She died on 19 July 2019 at the age of 85.

Filmography
1973 –  Andersson's Kalle on Top Form
1984 – Sömnen

References

Further reading

External links

1934 births
2019 deaths
Singers from Stockholm
Eurovision Song Contest entrants for Sweden
Eurovision Song Contest entrants of 1962
20th-century Swedish women singers
Melodifestivalen contestants of 1960